The PAL or Portable Audio Laboratory is a radio produced by Tivoli Audio. It was designed by Henry Kloss (1929–2002). Supporting both the FM and AM bands, it was designed as an outdoor, portable version of the earlier Model One.

Features
 2.5" magnetically shielded, treated full-range speaker
 5:1 ratio analog tuning dial
 AC/DC operation (External AC power supply/charger included)
 Auxiliary Input
 Battery status indicator
 Built-in battery charger
 Built-in telescoping FM antenna
 Designers colors available
 Henry Kloss Analog AM/FM Tuner with AFC
 NiMH rechargeable battery pack (Included)
 One Year Warranty
 Optional Carry Bag
 Portable
 Stereo Headphone Output
 Water-resistant cabinet

External links 
 Description at Tivoli Audio
 The PAL at audioreview.com

Models of radios